Jarreau is the sixth studio album by Al Jarreau, released in 1983. It was his third consecutive #1 album on the Billboard Jazz charts, while also placing at #4 on the R&B album charts and #13 on the Billboard 200. In 1984 the album received four Grammy Award nominations, including for Jay Graydon as Producer of the Year (Non-Classical).

The album contained three hit singles:  "Mornin'" (U.S. Pop #21, AC #2 for three weeks), "Boogie Down" (U.S. Pop #77) and "Trouble in Paradise" (U.S. Pop #63, AC #10). The first charted during the spring and summer, the second in the summer and the latter charted in the fall.

In 2001, the album was certified Platinum by the Recording Industry Association of America. It was remastered and re-released in 2009 by Friday Music.

The song "Black and Blues" has been rearranged for moderate use in marching band. A condensed version for trombone has also become widely popular in marching/pep bands.

Track listing

Personnel 
 Al Jarreau – lead vocals, backing vocals (1, 3-6), rhythm arrangements (5, 6, 9)
 Jay Graydon – guitars (1, 3, 4, 5, 7, 9), rhythm arrangements (1, 3-7, 9), synthesizers (5, 6), guitar solo (6)
 David Foster – rhythm arrangements (1, 4), Fender Rhodes (1, 4), synthesizers (1, 4), acoustic piano (4)
 Michael Omartian – rhythm arrangements (2), synthesizers (2), Fender Rhodes (5)
 Steve George – synthesizers (3)
 Robbie Buchanan – Fender Rhodes (3), synthesizers (5)
 Steve Porcaro – synthesizer programming (4)
 Theophilus T. Blood – additional synthesizers (4)
 Tom Canning – synthesizers (5, 6, 9), rhythm arrangements (5, 6, 9), acoustic piano (6), harmonica solo (6), Fender Rhodes (9)
 Greg Mathieson – rhythm arrangements (7), acoustic piano (7), Fender Rhodes (7), synthesizers (7)
 Jay Graydon – guitars (1, 3, 4, 5, 7, 9), rhythm arrangements (1, 3-7, 9), synthesizers (5, 6), guitar solo (6)
 Abraham Laboriel – bass guitar (1, 3-7, 9)
 Jeff Porcaro – drums (1, 5, 6), percussion (6)
 Steve Gadd – drums (2, 3, 4, 9)
 Grey Trevorson – drums (7)
 Victor Feldman – percussion (2, 3, 5)
 Jeremy Lubbock – string arrangements (1, 4), Fender Rhodes (8)
 Gerald Vinci – concertmaster (4)
 Ian Eales – string contractor (4)
 Lew McCreary – trombone (2, 4)
 Bill Reichenbach Jr. – trombone (2, 4-7, 9)
 Charlie Loper – trombone (5, 6, 7, 9)
 Chuck Findley – trumpet (2, 4-7, 9), flugelhorn (3)
 Gary Grant – trumpet (2, 4-7, 9), flugelhorn (3)
 Jerry Hey – horn arrangements (2-7, 9), trumpet (2, 4-7, 9), flugelhorn (3)
 Bill Champlin – backing vocals (2)
 Richard Page – backing vocals (2)
 Venetta Gloud – backing vocals (2)

Production 
 Producer – Jay Graydon
 Engineers – Jay Graydon and Ian Eales
 Recorded and mixed at Garden Rake Studios (Studio City, CA).
 Strings recorded by Eric Prestis at Ocean Way Recording (Hollywood, CA).
 Mastered by Steve Hall at Future Disc (Hollywood, CA).
 Album Coordination – Shirley Klein
 Art Direction – Christine Sauers
 Photography – Norman Seeff

Charts

References

Al Jarreau albums
1983 albums
Warner Records albums